Ortholexis melichroptera, the black scarce sprite, is a species of butterfly in the family Hesperiidae. It is found in Ghana, Nigeria (the Cross River Loop), Cameroon and Gabon. The habitat consists of dense primary forests.

References

Butterflies described in 1896
Hesperiidae
Butterflies of Africa